Adiss Harmandian (14 January 1945 – 1 September 2019) was a Lebanese-Armenian pop singer.

Early life
Harmandian was born Avedis Harmandian on 14 January 1945 in Beirut, Lebanon from Armenian genocide survivours. His stage name Adiss is a derivative of his given name.

Career
His career began in the 1960s, and his first single was the song "Dzaghigner", which quickly gained popularity among Lebanese and diaspora Armenians. Harmandian is considered a pioneer of the estradayin genre of Armenian music. Songs in the genre, such as Harmandian's own "Nouné" or "Karoun Karoun" are primarily sung in Armenian, and were influential in the formation of Armenian identity in Lebanon, the Middle East and throughout the Armenian diaspora. 

Harmandian has released 29 albums and around 400 songs and has received numerous awards, both abroad and in Armenia. During the Lebanese Civil War, Harmandian emigrated to the United States and resided in Los Angeles, CA.

Death
He died on 1 September 2019 at the age of 74 in UCLA Medical Center, Santa Monica, after a long 15-year fight with cancer.

References

External links
Adiss Harmandian on MySpace
Adiss Harmandian page on armenianmusic.com

1945 births
20th-century Lebanese male singers
Musicians from Beirut
Lebanese people of Armenian descent
Lebanese emigrants to the United States
American people of Armenian descent
2019 deaths